Kento Rina is an Indian politician from the state of Arunachal Pradesh. He is a member of the Bharatiya Janata Party.

Rina was elected from the Nari-Koyu constituency in the 2014 Arunachal Pradesh Legislative Assembly election, standing as a BJP candidate. Rina defeated Indian National Congress candidate Tako Dabi to win the seat.

Rina is a retired Arunachal Pradesh government employee, having served in the Education department as senior teacher, headmaster, vice principal, principal and Deputy Director of School Education (DDSE) throughout his tenure. He worked at Tezu in Lohit district of Arunachal Pradesh before retiring as DDSE.

See also
Arunachal Pradesh Legislative Assembly

References

External links
Kento Rina profile
MyNeta Profile

Living people
Bharatiya Janata Party politicians from Arunachal Pradesh
Arunachal Pradesh MLAs 2019–2024
Arunachal Pradesh MLAs 2014–2019
Year of birth missing (living people)